Tarabulida is a genus of daesiid camel spiders, first described by Carl Friedrich Roewer in 1933.

Species 
, the World Solifugae Catalog accepts the following two species:

 Tarabulida ephippiata Roewer, 1933 — Libya
 Tarabulida fumigata Roewer, 1933 — Libya

References 

Arachnid genera
Solifugae